MK was a mostly Afrikaans music channel, launched in mid-2005, as MK89, that is part of the DStv bouquet of satellite channels owned by MultiChoice/M-Net, based in South Africa. MK is for Musiek Kanaal (Music Channel) and 89 was the original channel number on DStv satellite decoders. When the channel number was changed to 324, the channel was renamed to MK. At the end of July 2013 DSTV cancelled the channel and opted to move it to its audio bouquet due to lack of viewers. MK maintained an active online presence on their YouTube Channel, Facebook Page and Website.

Even though the channel does not feature exclusively Afrikaans music, it has seen a tremendous boost for the resurging Afrikaans music scene, especially "indie" type of music. The coincidence of the channel's launch with a resurgence in South African filmmaking has helped stimulate the creation of high quality music videos, which has driven the look of the channel to a level that few could have anticipated at launch.

While the MTV influence in MK is apparent, it has managed to create an identity that is generally preferred compared to the international nature of the big music channels.

MK ceased to exist on the linear platform and is now trying to compete in a digital way on an international platform.

Shows on the channel

"Hoordosis" (A wordplay on the word oordosis which means overdose, and hoor means hear in Afrikaans). This show has the most airtime as it is a random collection of music videos.
"MyMK". A viewer's choice show, where one viewer's selection is played, international or South African.
"Studio 1" A show broadcast live, featuring local musicians and airing the most recent music charts both local and international.
"MK Skole" (Afrikaans for school). A Show presented by scholars around South-Africa, featuring their top 10 songs.
"Ondergrond" (Afrikaans "onder" - under; "grond" - ground). An hour-long segment each week dedicated to the metal-heads. This show features South African bands as well as international.
"Kraakvars" (Afrikaans expression directly translates to "fresh"). This show features the most recent music videos musicians have to offer.

Previous shows
"Mullets" (Mullet referring to the hair- and lifestyle). A show started by an ex-member of the "AF" team where two hilbilly-like characters tour the country, supposedly myth busting, but in fact just disguising AF-style stunts as myths.  
"Jol24" (Jol is Afrikaans for fun or partying). A reality show where a viewer is given a video camera and a R1000 for 24 hours to document his/her day as he/she parties and socializes. 
"Fliekfix". A show that highlights the latest movies on the South African circuit.
"X". A show featuring only international videos. Three choices, from members of the public, are played at the end.
"Draadloos" (Afrikaans for wireless). An unplugged studio session featuring established as well as new music artists.
"Hoenner" (Afrikaans slang for chicken). Another group of young people doing silly stunts. The stunts sometimes involve assembly of elaborate contraptions. There is a rumored rivalry with the "Af" cast members.
"Petrolkop" (Afrikaans for petrolhead). Presented by local star Snotkop, a.k.a. Lekgoa, this show featured celebrities driving racing cars in time trials against each other.
"Wys my jou Huis" (Show me your House in Afrikaans). A South African version of Cribs, where the homes of local musicians are shown. The differences between the two shows are apparent, as the South African music industry is much less lucrative in comparison to the American music industry.
"Susters" (Sisters in Afrikaans). With a somewhat playfully prudish title, this show features all kinds of female interests, from make-up tips to hot rock stars to tattoo artists. 
"ID" (In Afrikaans the sound of these letters corresponds to the word idea). This is a makeover show featuring Fanie as well as Adele. Aimed at a female audience, this show is popular in both gender groups.
"Hip-hop". A magazine show focused on the South African hip-hop scene, and includes international hip-hop music videos.
"MKchat". A show with a studio guest which chat in real time with viewers on an Internet chat room while a DJ plays in the background. The chat thread is displayed onscreen with a corner insert of the guest.
"Jip". Based on a weekly newspaper insert, this show is a general magazine program which includes interviews and articles. The show is older than the channel and was migrated to MK89 by MultiChoice as it is a better fit here than on the previous, English only, channel "Go". It is renowned for its parodic inserts, some of the best film-making on the channel.
"Stook" (Afrikaans for stoke or burn). A lifestyle magazine show featuring reviews of movies, albums and videogames. The presenter has a celebrity guest to help him with reviews, and includes informal interviewing.
"Amp". A show where an interviewer follows an artist/group around for a typical day in their lives, with snippets of the featured artist/group's music videos thrown in.
"Gons" (Afrikaans for buzz or hum). This is a studio based interview show with an artist/group or actor. The guests are asked to choose a music video at the end of the show. This show is the most formal show on the channel.
"Af" (Afrikaans for "Off" in the context of not being correct). A show that features a set group of nicknamed students, doing silly (but almost always hurtful) stunts, annoying the unsuspecting public or just indulging in general strange behaviour. This show closely copies MTV’s "Jackass". The show’s main cast member presents the show in Ashton Kutcher’s style in MTV’s "Punk’d" (Black and white monologues with an all white background. The camera angles are face and profiles shots while he is talking, and switches randomly). 
The Vuilhonne (Afrikaans slang for dirty dogs), as the group call themselves, have become celebrities, even featuring on national magazine covers. "AF" is by far the most popular programme on the channel, across gender and racial groups. 
"Matrix" (In Afrikaans with parts in English). A South African reality show in which eight girls, who have just finished school, are given a Matric Rage (also known as Matric Rave) holiday (the South African equivalent of Schoolies week). All the young adults who have just finished school migrate to the coastal towns to celebrate. The show documents the girls going to a house in Keurbooms Strand, Plettenberg Bay which is part of South Africa's Garden Route. The girls entered this reality show, which boasts a sum of money as a prize, with their best friend. There are multiple occurrences during this holiday that challenge the girls, including dealing with problems in the area relating to a flood which occurred in the area days before their arrival, such as there being no running water for a number of days. The girls vote for a winner each episode and then an overall winner is picked from a final count of the votes at the end of the show.

External links
 

Television stations in South Africa
Television channels and stations established in 2005
Television channels and stations disestablished in 2013
Defunct mass media in South Africa